Sweeting is a surname. Notable people with the surname include:

Bryce Sweeting (born 1994), Canadian lacrosse player
Clay Sweeting, Bahamian politician
Charles W. Sweeting (1854–1937), American politician
Marjorie Sweeting (1920–1994), British geomorphologist
Robert Sweeting (cyclist), American cyclist born 1987
Robert Sweeting (politician), Bahamian politician
Ryan Sweeting (born 1987), Bahamian tennis player